Galina Igorevna Shirshina was the mayor of Petrozavodsk, Republic of Karelia, Russia.

Shirshina was born on May 12, 1979 in the village Alakurtti of Murmansk region. Her family moved to Petrozavodsk in 1984.

Galina Shirshina was mayor of Petrozavodsk between September 2013 and December 2015. Shirshina was originally a self-nominated candidate at the mayoral election. She was later supported by the opposition party Yabloko after the registration of their own candidate Emilia Slabunova was cancelled. Shirshina's electoral victory was considered as a major victory of Russian Democratic opposition. However, in her role as mayor she thought of herself more as a civil servant who should be outside politics.

In December 2015, members of the Petrozavodsk City Council dismissed the mayor Galina Shirshina “for failure to perform their duties.” Alexander Khudilaynen, the Head of the Republic of Karelia, supported resignation of the mayor. In January 2016 the news told that Shirshina is going to sue Petrozavodsk's legislature for dismissal.

Career 
Shirshina has been working at the student organization of University as well as on the Inter-Faculty Department of Psychology.

For few years Shirshina chaired the department of educational psychology. Before that she has been teaching psychology at the university.
 
Before the Petrozavodsk mayoral election in 2013 Shirshina worked as a director of the local publishing house.

References

External links

 City Mayor Galina Shirshina  
 Galina Shirshina on Facebook

1979 births
Living people
People from Murmansk Oblast
21st-century Russian women politicians
Yabloko politicians
Mayors of Petrozavodsk
Herzen University alumni